Shahrah (also Romanized as Shāhrāh) is a village in Kakhk Rural District, Kakhk District, Gonabad County, Razavi Khorasan Province, Iran. At the 2006 census, its population was 23, in 5 families.

References 

Populated places in Gonabad County